Saperda tetrastigma is a species of beetle in the family Cerambycidae. It was described by Henry Walter Bates in 1879. It is known from South Korea, Japan and Taiwan.

References

tetrastigma
Beetles described in 1879